Drakri Hermitage is a historic hermitage in Tibet, belonging to Sera Monastery.

Structure
The hermitage grounds consists of five sections:
Main temple compound, renovated around a courtyard and comprising:
Temple
Kitchen
Monks' living quarters
Terraced complex: Formerly stables and living quarters, now in ruins
Building foundations: Formerly monks' living quarters, also in ruins
Stable for dzo (a yak–cow hybrid)
Huts: Nuns' living quarters

History
While the hermitage (whose name derives from brag ri, meaning "crag" or "gorge") is believed to have been founded during the 18th century, little documentation of its early history exists. In 1959, the monks were evicted and Drakri converted into a prison with a reputation for severity. With the expansion of other prisons in Lhasa, Drakri was eventually abandoned.

During the 1980s a representative of a rival sect to that of the original owners (headed by the Bari Lama) began restoration work on the hermitage to convert it to a Nyingma practice center. In response to objections raised by a representative of the previous owner (who was, however, unable to renovate the estate himself), the Nyingma devotee has asserted that he is renovating the hermitage in stewardship rather than ownership.

Footnotes

Sera Monastery
Buddhist hermitages in Lhasa
Nyingma monasteries and temples
Chengguan District, Lhasa